Wierzyca is a river of Poland, a tributary of the Vistula in Gniew.  Among its own tributaries is the Mała Wierzyca.

See also
Mała Wierzyca

References

Rivers of Poland
Rivers of Pomeranian Voivodeship